The international conference Petersberg Climate Dialogue (in German: Petersberger Klimadialog) is a series of negotiations to prepare the yearly UN Climate Change Conferences in spring or summer time between the COP conferences. The appointed next COP-president with his delegation usually is the co-host of PCD.

History
The first meeting was initiated after the nearly completely failed negotiations at the 2009 United Nations Climate Change Conference in Copenhagen (COP15), by German politician and chancellor Angela Merkel to improve communication with leaders and between the environmental ministers. It was held April 2–4, 2010 in Hotel Petersberg on the hill named "Petersberg" near the German city of Bonn, the seat of UNFCCC. In subsequent years the conference took place in Berlin. Every year, Merkel has given a speech and taken part in the discussions. Implementation of climate policy is the next challenge.

PCD XI, 2020
In 2020, April 27 and 28, ministers of 30 countries meet online in a video conference for negotiations and talks about COP26, the 2021 United Nations Climate Change Conference in Glasgow. Speeches were given by the Federal Minister for the Environment, Nature Conservation, and Nuclear Safety in Germany, Svenja Schulze and by Alok Sharma (president of COP26) and António Guterres, Secretary-General of the United Nations. Merkel talked about an environment-friendly global "recovery program" from the COVID-19 pandemic economic crisis on a more sustainable and inclusive path — "taxpayers' money is needed to rescue businesses, it must be creating green jobs and sustainable and inclusive growth" and "Fossil fuel subsidies must end, and carbon must have a price and polluters must pay for their pollution", Guterres said in his speech. The Twitter tweets (hashtag #PCD11) were visible on the conference website for an additional dialogue, following the two conference days.

References

External links
 Petersberg Climate Dialogue XI PCD11, Website of Federal Ministry of the Environment, Nature Conservation and Nuclear Safety, bmu.de, videos and speeches of participants of the conference, #PCD11 tweets.

Diplomatic conferences
Climate change policy
Angela Merkel
Petersberg (Siebengebirge)